The pols and springar are Norwegian folk dances in 3/4. They are essentially fast versions of the Nordic polska.

References

Norwegian folk dances
Norwegian folk music
Dance in Norway